Georissa saulae is a species of a minute land snail that have an operculum, a terrestrial gastropod mollusk in the family Hydrocenidae.

Distribution
This species lives in Sabah, Malaysian Borneo.

References

Hydrocenidae
Endemic fauna of Borneo
Invertebrates of Borneo
Gastropods of Asia
Sabah
Gastropods described in 1966